The Bujeon Line is a short railway line serving Busan, South Korea.  The line connects Gaya on the Gaya Line to Bujeon on the Donghae Nambu Line, without intermediary stops.  It is roughly 2.2 kilometers in length.

See also
Korean National Railroad

Railway lines in South Korea